Simon Raw (born 2 August 1994) is a South African rugby union player for the  in the Currie Cup. His regular position is prop.

Raw was named in the  side for the 2022 Currie Cup Premier Division.

References

South African rugby union players
Living people
Rugby union props
Boland Cavaliers players
Pumas (Currie Cup) players
1994 births
Griffons (rugby union) players